DASD may refer to:

 Direct-access storage device, a computer storage device

Education
 DeForest Area School District
 Downingtown Area School District
 DuBois Area School District